Mohammad Hanif is an Islamic scholar who developed the writing system for the Rohingya language, the Hanifi Rohingya script, during the 1980s. A Rohingya from Rakhine, Hanif currently works as a madrasa teacher in Bangladesh.

References 

Year of birth missing (living people)
Living people
Rohingya people